Carmelo Patrono is an Italian production designer and art director. He was nominated for an Academy Award in the category Best Art Direction for the film Brother Sun, Sister Moon.

Selected filmography
 Brother Sun, Sister Moon (1973)

References

External links

Year of birth missing (living people)
Living people
Italian production designers
Italian art directors